Russ Silvestri (born October 12, 1961) is an American sailor. He competed in the Finn event at the 2000 Summer Olympics.

References

External links
 

1961 births
Living people
American male sailors (sport)
Olympic sailors of the United States
Sailors at the 2000 Summer Olympics – Finn
Sportspeople from San Francisco